Parivesh Dhar (born 16 March 2000) is an Indian cricketer. He made his Twenty20 debut on 16 January 2021, for Chhattisgarh in the 2020–21 Syed Mushtaq Ali Trophy.

References

External links
 

2000 births
Living people
Indian cricketers
Chhattisgarh cricketers
Place of birth missing (living people)